Colonel Richard Roethe (1865–1944) was a German Army officer and an influential figure in German military aviation during World War I.  In 1914 he succeeded Colonel Walter von Eberhardt as the Inspector of Flying Troops, remaining in that post until 1916. Richard passed away in 1944 at age 79.

|-

1865 births
1944 deaths
Luftstreitkräfte personnel